Martin Müürsepp (born 26 September 1974) is an Estonian professional basketball coach and former player, who is the head coach of BC Rakvere Tarvas of the Estonian-Latvian Basketball League. Widely regarded as one of Estonia's greatest basketball players of all time, he is the only Estonian to have played in the National Basketball Association (NBA).

Early life
Müürsepp was born in Tallinn, to Hilja Volter, who worked in a barbecue restaurant, and Suido Müürsepp, a truck driver. He attended the Tallinn Secondary School No. 39, the Tallinn Secondary School No. 43, and the Tallinn Secondary School No. 49, leaving without graduating in 1991. Müürsepp started playing basketball when he was nine years old, under coach Andres Sõber. He made his Korvpalli Meistriliiga debut in 1990, at age 15, playing for TPedI. In the 1990–91 season, Müürsepp played with Andris of the II liiga, winning the Estonian Cup.

Professional career

Early years (1992–1996)
In 1992, Müürsepp moved to Sweden and joined Alviks BK of the Swedish Basketball League (SBL).

In 1993, Müürsepp signed a 12-year, $5 million contract with the Israeli powerhouse Maccabi Tel Aviv. He subsequently played with Maccabi Tel Aviv's reserve team and Hapoel Haifa of the Israel Basketball Super League (IBSL).

In 1995, he was loaned to Kalev of the Korvpalli Meistriliiga (KML). Müürsepp led Kalev to the Estonian league championship and the Estonian Cup, averaging 16.9 points, 6.2 rebounds and 1.0 assists per game for the 1995–96 season.

Miami Heat (1996–1997)
On 26 June 1996, Müürsepp was selected with the 25th overall pick in the 1996 NBA draft by the Utah Jazz. The Jazz then traded him to the Miami Heat for a 2000 first round draft pick. On 12 September 1996, Müürsepp signed a three-year, $1.8 million contract with the Heat. Müürsepp made his NBA debut on 21 December 1996 in a 86–66 away win over the Houston Rockets. He finished with 2 points, one rebound and one assist in one minute and 22 seconds during the fourth quarter. He averaged 1.7 points, 0.5 rebounds and 0.3 assists per game in 10 games for the Heat.

Dallas Mavericks (1997–1998)
On 14 February 1997, the Heat traded Müürsepp, Predrag Danilović and Kurt Thomas to the Dallas Mavericks in exchange for Jamal Mashburn. He made his debut for the Mavericks a day later, scoring 2 points in a 84–99 away loss to the Utah Jazz. In the 1996–97 season, Müürsepp averaged 4.3 points, 1.9 rebounds and 0.5 assists per game for the Mavericks. He missed the first 14 games of the 1997–98 season with a foot injury. On 5 March 1998, Müürsepp scored a career-high 24 points in a 119–109 home win over the Los Angeles Clippers. He appeared in 41 games (7 starts) during the 1997–98 season, averaging 5.7 points, 2.8 rebounds, 0.7 assists and 0.7 steals in 14.7 minutes.

NBA lockout (1998–1999)
On 24 June 1998, the Mavericks traded Müürsepp, Pat Garrity, Bubba Wells and a 1999 first round draft pick to the Phoenix Suns for Steve Nash. However, due to a lockout, the 1998–99 season did not start until 5 February 1999. During the lockout, Müürsepp made two appearances in the Estonian League, playing for Nybit. The Estonian Basketball Association was subsequently fined for allowing Müürsepp to play with a without prior permission from FIBA. On 23 January 1999, the Suns traded Müürsepp, Mark Bryant, Bubba Wells and a 1999 first round draft pick to the Chicago Bulls for Luc Longley.

Greece (1999–2001)
On 1 February 1999, Müürsepp signed with Aris of the HEBA A1. In May 1999, he was suspended by the HEBA for three months for use of ephedrine.

On 15 July 1999, Müürsepp signed with AEK on a one-year, $700,000 contract with an option to extend for another season. Müürsepp helped AEK win the FIBA Saporta Cup in 2000 and two consecutive Greek Cups in 2000 and 2001. AEK reached the 2000–01 Euroleague semifinals, where they were eliminated by Baskonia. In the Euroleague, he averaged 8.6 points, 4.9 rebounds and 0.7 assists per game in 17 games.

Russia (2001–2006)
In September 2001, Müürsepp signed a one-year contract with UNICS Kazan of the Superliga A.

On 14 August 2002, Müürsepp signed with Dynamo Moscow on a one-year contract. However, he left the club in November 2002 after they failed to pay his wages for the second consecutive month. In December 2002, Müürsepp signed with Ural Great Perm for the rest of the season.

On 18 June 2003, Müürsepp re-signed with UNICS Kazan. He led Kazan to the 2003–04 FIBA Europe League title and was named the Europe League Finals Most Valuable Player (MVP), scoring a game-high 22 points in 87–63 win over Maroussi.

On 17 June 2004, Müürsepp signed a one-year contract with Russian champions CSKA Moscow. In the 2004–05 season, he won the Russian championship and the Russian Cup. CSKA Moscow reached the 2005 Euroleague Final Four, losing 78–85 to Baskonia in the semifinal and 91–94 to Panathinaikos in the third place game. Over 24 Euroleague games, Müürsepp averaged 8.0 points, 3.3 rebounds and 0.9 assists per game.

On 11 July 2005, Müürsepp returned to UNICS Kazan for a second time, signing a one-year contract.

Late career (2006–2010)
On 27 June 2006, Müürsepp returned to Estonia by signing a one-year contract with University of Tartu. He won his second Estonian championship in 2007.

On 23 August 2007, Müürsepp signed a one-year contract with the Melbourne Tigers of the National Basketball League (NBL). He was released by the Tigers in December 2007 due to an ankle injury.

On 28 February 2008, Müürsepp signed with Kalev/Cramo. He left Kalev/Cramo after the 2008–09 season without having played in an official game for the team.

On 26 February 2010, Müürsepp joined Rakvere Tarvas, where he was reunited with Andres Sõber, his first coach. He retired after the 2009–10 season.

Coaching career
Müürsepp began his coaching career in August 2010 as an assistant coach for Kalev/Cramo under head coach Aivar Kuusmaa, a position he held for seven years. He won six Estonian championships (2011–2014, 2016, 2017) and two Estonian Cups (2015, 2016) with Kalev/Cramo.

In 2013, Müürsepp served as an assistant coach for the Belarus national team during the 2015 EuroBasket qualifying tournament.

On 6 January 2018, Müürsepp became an assistant coach for Tallinna Kalev/TLÜ under head coach Gert Kullamäe. In January 2019, he became the head coach for Tallinna Kalev/TLÜ following Kullamäe's mid-season departure.

National team career
Müürsepp was a member of the Soviet Union junior national team that finished fifth at the 1991 European Championship for Cadets, averaging 10.6 points per game. He also represented the Estonia national junior team.

Müürsepp began playing for the senior Estonian national team in 1993. He led Estonia at the 2001 European Championship, averaging 18.3 points, 5.7 rebounds and 0.7 assists per game in three games. The team finished the tournament with a 0–3 record for 14th place. Müürsepp finished his national team career in 2007.

Career statistics

NBA

Regular season

|-
|align=left rowspan=2| 
|align=left| Miami
| 10 || 0 || 2.9 || .357 || .250 || .429 || .5 || .3 || .0 || .1 || 1.7
|-
|align=left| Dallas
| 32 || 0 || 10.0 || .419 || .150 || .679 || 1.9 || .5 || .4 || .3 || 4.3
|-
|align=left| 
|align=left| Dallas
| 41 || 7 || 14.7 || .435 || .421 || .761 || 2.8 || .7 || .7 || .3 || 5.7
|- class="sortbottom"
|style="text-align:center;" colspan=2|Career
| 83 || 7 || 11.5 || .425 || .323 || .693 || 2.2 || .6 || .5 || .3 || 4.7

Euroleague

|-
| align="left" | 2000–01
| align="left" | AEK
| 17 || 14 || 21.5 || .423 || .235 || .490 || 4.9 || .7 || .9 || .2 || 8.6 || 7.0
|-
| align="left" | 2004–05
| align="left" | CSKA Moscow
| 24 || 6 || 17.5 || .528 || .462 || .645 || 3.3 || .9 || .7 || .2 || 8.0 || 7.6
|- class="sortbottom"
|style="text-align:center;" colspan=2|Career
| 41 || 20 || 19.1 || .475 || .333 || .575 || 4.0 || .8 || .8 || .2 || 8.3 || 7.4

Awards and accomplishments

Club career
Andris
 Estonian Cup winner: 1991

Kalev
 Estonian League champion: 1996
 Estonian Cup winner: 1996

AEK
 FIBA Saporta Cup champion: 2000
 2× Greek Cup winner: 2000, 2001

UNICS Kazan
 FIBA Europe League champion: 2004

CSKA Moscow
 Russian League champion: 2005
 Russian Cup winner: 2005

University of Tartu
 Estonian League champion: 2007

Individual
 FIBA Europe League Finals Most Valuable Player: 2004
 4× Estonian Player of the Year: 1996, 2001, 2004, 2005

References

Further reading

External links

 Martin Müürsepp at fiba.com
 Martin Müürsepp at basket.ee 
 Martin Müürsepp at euroleague.net

1974 births
Living people
AEK B.C. players
Aris B.C. players
BC Dynamo Moscow players
BC Kalev/Cramo players
BC Rakvere Tarvas players
BC UNICS players
Centers (basketball)
Dallas Mavericks players
Estonian basketball coaches
Estonian expatriate basketball people in Australia
Estonian expatriate basketball people in Belarus
Estonian expatriate basketball people in Greece
Estonian expatriate basketball people in Israel
Estonian expatriate basketball people in Russia
Estonian expatriate basketball people in Sweden
Estonian expatriate basketball people in the United States
Estonian men's basketball players
Greek Basket League players
Korvpalli Meistriliiga players
Melbourne Tigers players
Miami Heat players
PBC CSKA Moscow players
PBC Ural Great players
Power forwards (basketball)
Basketball players from Tallinn
Tartu Ülikool/Rock players
Utah Jazz draft picks
KK Kalev players
Alviks BK players